Castle Ward was a rural district of the administrative county of Northumberland, England from 1894 to 1974, covering an area north-west of the city of Newcastle upon Tyne. It was named after the historic Castle ward of Northumberland. The council offices were located in Ponteland.

In 1974, under the reforms established by the Local Government Act 1972, most of the district was merged to form part of Castle Morpeth, while the southernmost part joined the metropolitan borough of Newcastle in the new metropolitan county of Tyne & Wear. Castle Ward, one of the modern day electoral wards of the City of Newcastle, takes its name from the district and shares some of its territory, such as in Dinnington.

References

Districts of England created by the Local Government Act 1894
Districts of England abolished by the Local Government Act 1972
History of Northumberland
Rural districts of England